The Rex T. Barber Veterans Memorial Bridge is a concrete arch bridge in the western United States; it spans the Crooked River gorge in Jefferson County in central  Oregon. Designed by T. Y. Lin International, the bridge was completed in 2000 to replace the Crooked River High Bridge. Parallel and west, the older bridge was built in 1926 and was not wide enough to accommodate increased traffic on US 97.

It was the first bridge in the United States to use a cast-in-place segmental method of construction.

Initially named the Crooked River Bridge, it was renamed in 2003 for Rex T. Barber (1917–2001), a native of the area. A World War II fighter pilot in the Pacific Theater, Barber shot down the plane carrying Japanese Admiral Isoroku Yamamoto in 1943.

See also

List of bridges documented by the Historic American Engineering Record in Oregon
List of bridges in the United States by height

References

External links

Waymarking.com – Rex T. Barber Veterans Memorial Bridge
; includes construction photos

Open-spandrel deck arch bridges in the United States
Monuments and memorials in Oregon
Bridges completed in 2000
Road bridges in Oregon
U.S. Route 97
Bridges of the United States Numbered Highway System
2000 establishments in Oregon
Concrete bridges in the United States
Historic American Engineering Record in Oregon
Transportation buildings and structures in Jefferson County, Oregon